Radovan Višković (born 1 February 1964) is a Bosnian Serb politician who is the 12th and current Prime Minister of Republika Srpska and a member of the Alliance of Independent Social Democrats (SNSD).

Early life and education
Višković was born on 1 February 1964 in Buljevići, near Vlasenica (today in the municipality of Milići). He obtained the title of graduate traffic engineer at the Faculty of Transportation in Sarajevo (Road Transport) in 1990, then working there as assistant. 

Višković completed postgraduate studies at the Faculty of Technology in Zvornik in 2005, and doctoral studies at the Faculty of Transportation in Doboj in 2015. He was then appointed assistant professor at the Faculty of Transportation in Doboj in the field of Transport Engineering, Road Traffic and Transport.

Career
In July 1995, Lieutenant Višković worked as traffic assistant at the General Staff of the Army of Republika Srpska. According to the ICTY archive documents, on 13 July during the Srebrenica genocide, he was in contact with Colonel Rajko Krsmanović, traffic officer of convicted war criminal Radislav Krstić, about the transfer of captured Srebrenica Bosniaks (including the 700 captured in Sandići) to places such as Bratunac and Zvornik, where they were later shot. ICTY witnesses recall Višković meeting with Krsmanović right before the fall of Srebrenica, and later seeing him near the stadium in Nova Kasaba where captured people were detained. In 2020, a witness testified at the trial of former police officers Miodrag Josipović and Branimir Tešić on Srebrenica-related charges in Bosnia, saying that Višković offered him money to dig up a mass grave in Milići in 1996. Public media in Republika Srpska published the identity of the protected witness. Višković rebutted all allegations and announced lawsuits against the media and individuals who published the news.

After the war, he worked for the company "Bauxite" in Milići, as executive director for the transport sector.

Višković began his political career in 2004 as a member of the Municipal Assembly of Milići, and in 2006, 2010, 2014 and 2018 he was elected as member of the National Assembly of Republika Srpska. He was Chairman of the parliamentary group of the Alliance of Independent Social Democrats (SNSD).

On 2 November 2018, Milorad Dodik, the President of SNSD announced that Višković would be his choice for the new Prime Minister of Republika Srpska, succeeding Željka Cvijanović, who successfully ran for the position of President of Republika Srpska.

Personal life
Višković is married and has two children.

References

External links

Radovan Višković at eKapija

1964 births
Living people
People from Milići
Serbs of Bosnia and Herzegovina
University of Sarajevo alumni
Alliance of Independent Social Democrats politicians
Prime ministers of Republika Srpska